Andrews, Jaques & Rantoul was an American architectural firm founded in Boston, Massachusetts in 1883 and composed of architects Robert Day Andrews, Herbert Jaques and Augustus Neal Rantoul. The firm, with its successors, was in business continuously from 1883 to 1970, for a total of eighty-seven years of architectural practice.

History
The firm was established in July 1883 as Andrews & Jaques by Robert Day Andrews (1857–1928) and Herbert Jaques (1857–1916). Both architects had graduated from the Massachusetts Institute of Technology in 1877 and spent several years in the office and studio of Henry Hobson Richardson. In 1887 they were joined by Angustus N. Rantoul (1865–1934). When Rantoul joined the partnership in 1889, the firm became Andrews, Jaques & Rantoul. 

The partnership structure was unchanged until Jaques retired in 1909, with his share of the firm taken over by I. Howland Jones (1868–1959). When Jaques died in 1916 the firm was renamed Andrews, Rantoul & Jones. In 1924 Rantoul retired and Maurice B. Biscoe (1871–1953) and John T. Whitmore (1893–1943) became partners in the reorganized Andrews, Jones, Biscoe & Whitmore.

Andrews died in 1928, though the name of the firm was not changed. Whitmore died in 1943, and Edwin B. Goodell Jr. (1893–1970) became partner in the firm, which became Andrews, Jones, Biscoe & Goodell. Biscoe died in 1953, and Jones retired in 1955. Goodell continued to practice under his own name until his death in 1970.

In 1888 the firm established a western office in Denver, Colorado, moving it to Chicago in 1892. It was closed not long afterwards.

Legacy
The firm designed numerous buildings that are listed on the U.S. National Register of Historic Places. Despite many listings as Andrews, Jacques & Rantoul, even during the years they operated, the firm name is correctly spelled: Andrews, Jaques & Rantoul.

Architectural works
 The Robert Chamblet Hooper Mansion (1889), 448 Beacon, Boston, Massachusetts
 Gov. Frank West Rollins House (1890), Concord, New Hampshire
 The Equitable Building (1892), Denver, Colorado
 The Montgomery Building (1892), southeast corner of Milwaukee & Michigan Streets, Milwaukee, Wisconsin
 Coburn Library (1894; demolished, 1962)
 The Boston Building (1894), Denver, Colorado
Worcester County Courthouse, Worcester, Massachusetts (1899 addition)
 The Hartford Club (1901), Hartford, Connecticut
 Palmer Hall (1904), Colorado College, Colorado Springs
 Dexter Building (1913), Downtown Crossing, Boston, Massachusetts
 Massachusetts State House white marble wings, Boston, Massachusetts (1914-17)

Notes

References

Architecture firms based in Massachusetts